Linda Le Bon (born 20 July 1964) is a Belgian para-alpine skier. She competes in the B2 category, which is for visually impaired athletes. She has a vision impairment as a result of macular degeneration.

Her sight guide is nominally Pierre Couquelet.

Career 
Le Bon competed at the 2021 World Para Snow Sports Championships held in Lillehammer, Norway, winning the silver medal in the downhill and super-G events. 

Le Bon and her sighted guide and daughter Ulla Gilot qualified to represent Belgium at the 2022 Winter Paralympics held in Beijing, China. Couquelet was originally scheduled to be Le Bon's sighted guide but he was not able to compete as her guide after failing a doping test due to an administrative error related to medication that he takes. Le Bon competed in five alpine skiing events. She was the flag bearer for Belgium during the closing ceremony.

References 

1964 births
Living people
Belgian female alpine skiers
Visually impaired category Paralympic competitors
People from Wilrijk
Belgian blind people
Alpine skiers at the 2022 Winter Paralympics
Paralympic alpine skiers of Belgium
21st-century Belgian women